Siman tov is a Hebrew-language congratulatory expression, and also serves as a Jewish given name or surname. Notable people with the name under various transliterations include:

Zablon Simintov, second-last Jew in Afghanistan until 2021
Maya Simantov, Israeli singer and songwriter
Siman-Tov Ganeh (1924–1968), Israeli soldier
Rita Gabbai-Simantov, Greek-Jewish poet and writer
Siman-Tov Brothers, founders of Lili Diamonds

See also
 Yaacov Bar-Siman-Tov, Israeli scholar

Hebrew-language names
Jewish surnames
Jewish given names

he:סימן_טוב